David Alan Johnson (born 29 October 1970 in Dinnington, West Riding of Yorkshire) is an English former professional footballer who scored 15 goals from 105 appearances in the Football League playing as a forward for Sheffield Wednesday, Hartlepool United (in two separate loan spells), and Lincoln City. He was Lincoln's leading scorer in the 
1993–94 season with 13 goals in all competitions. After leaving Lincoln in 1996 he joined the Conference club Altrincham.

Dave took a break from football after leaving Altrincham. After the break he joined Thundridge City FC as a player-coach, his most memorable moment being his overhead kick in a league match. He has now taken on a full coaching role for the club and has led the team to two top half finishes, two seasons in a row. Thundridge City FC earned promotion in the 2015/16 season.

Despite Johnson enjoying early success with Thundridge, he has recently found himself under pressure from the club's board following a poor first half of the 2016/17 season. Dubbed the "Yorkshire Ranieri", he matches the Italian's Leicester record in finding success one season, followed by disappointment the next.

References

1970 births
Living people
People from Dinnington, South Yorkshire
Footballers from South Yorkshire
English footballers
Association football forwards
Sheffield Wednesday F.C. players
Hartlepool United F.C. players
Lincoln City F.C. players
Altrincham F.C. players
English Football League players
National League (English football) players